WASP-1b is an extrasolar planet orbiting the star WASP-1 located 1,300 light-years away in the constellation Andromeda.

Orbit and mass

The planet's mass and radius indicate that it is a gas giant with a similar bulk composition to Jupiter. Unlike Jupiter, but similar to many other planets detected around other stars, WASP-1b is located very close to its star, and belongs to the class of planets known as hot Jupiters.

WASP-1 b was discovered via the transit method by SuperWASP, for which the star and planet are named. Follow-up radial velocity measurements confirmed the presence of an unseen companion, and allowed for the mass of WASP-1 b to be determined.

In 2018, it was discovered by observation of Rossiter-McLaughlin effect what the orbit of WASP-1b is strongly misaligned with rotational axis of the star by 79.0 degrees, making it a nearly "polar" orbit.

See also
 HD 209458 b
 WASP-2b

References

Further reading

External links

 
 BBC News article
 WASP Planets

Exoplanets discovered by WASP
Exoplanets discovered in 2006
Giant planets
Hot Jupiters
Transiting exoplanets
Andromeda (constellation)